Navrátil (feminine Navrátilová) is a Czech surname. 

Notable people with the surname Navrátil, Navratil, Navrátilová or Navratilova include:

 Gabriela Navrátilová (born 1976), Czech tennis player
 Jakub Navrátil (born 1984), Czech footballer
 Jan Navrátil (born 1990), Czech football midfielder
 Jaroslav Navrátil (footballer) (born 1991), Czech footballer
 Jaroslav Navrátil (sport shooter) (born 1943), Czech Olympic shooter
 Jaroslav Navrátil (tennis) (born 1957), Czech tennis player
 Jiří Navrátil (1923–2017), Czech scouting personality
 Josef Navrátil (1798–1865), Bohemian painter
 Karel Navrátil (1867–1936), Czech violinist
 Leo Navratil (1921–2006), Austrian psychiatrist and author
 Martina Navratilova (born 1956), Czech-American tennis player
 Michal Navrátil (born 1985), Czech diver
 Michal Navrátil (tennis) (born 1982), Czech tennis player
 Michel Marcel Navratil (1908–2001), RMS Titanic survivor
 Miloslav Navrátil, Czech darts player
 Miroslav Navratil (1893–1947), Croatian soldier, pilot and general
 Zane Navratil (born 1995), a professional pickleball player

See also
 
 
 Nawratil, a variant of Navratil

References

Czech-language surnames